The following is a list of the 60 municipalities (comuni) of the Province of Viterbo, Lazio, Italy.

List

See also
List of municipalities of Italy

References

 01
Viterbo